The Gopo Awards are the national Romanian film awards, similar to the Academy Awards (US), the Goya Awards (Spain), or the César Award (France). They are presented by the Association for Romanian Film Promotion and were inaugurated in 2007.

Trophy
Established in 2007, the Gopo Awards were named in honour of Romanian film director Ion Popescu-Gopo, also celebrating the 50th anniversary of his winning a prize in the Cannes Film Festival. The trophy is a sculpture by Romanian artist Adrian Ilfoveanu representing Gopo's Little Man, the main character of Gopo's animation films. The Gopo Awards honour the best Romanian cinematic achievements of the previous year (or, in the case of the "Best European Film" award, the best European film distributed in Romania in the previous year).

Categories
 Best film
 Best director
 Best screenplay
 Best actor
 Best actress
 Best actor in supporting role
 Best actress in supporting role
 Best cinematography
 Best film editing
 Best sound
 Best original music score
 Best art direction
 Best costume design
 Best documentary film
 Best short film
 Best debut
 Best box office success
 Life achievement
 Best European film

Selected winners

Best film
 2007  12:08 East of Bucharest (Corneliu Porumboiu)
 2008 4 Months, 3 Weeks and 2 Days (Cristian Mungiu)
 2009 The Rest Is Silence (Nae Caranfil)
 2010 Police, Adjective (Corneliu Porumboiu)
 2011 If I Want to Whistle, I Whistle (Florin Șerban)
 2012 Aurora (Cristi Puiu)
 2013 Everybody in Our Family (Radu Jude)
 2014 Child's Pose (Călin Peter Netzer)
 2015 Closer to the Moon (Nae Caranfil)
 2016 Aferim! (Radu Jude)
 2017 Sieranevada (Cristi Puiu)
2018 One Step Behind the Seraphim (Daniel Sandu)
2019 Moromeții 2 (Stere Gulea)
2020 The Whistlers (Corneliu Porumboiu)
2021 Collective (Alexander Nanau)
2022 Bad Luck Banging or Loony Porn (Radu Jude)

Best director
 2007 Corneliu Porumboiu for 12:08 East of Bucharest 
 2008 Cristian Mungiu for 4 Months, 3 Weeks and 2 Days
 2009 Radu Muntean for Boogie
 2010 Corneliu Porumboiu for Police, Adjective
 2011 Florin Șerban for If I Want to Whistle, I Whistle
 2012 Cristi Puiu for Aurora
 2013 Radu Jude for Everybody in Our Family
 2014 Călin Peter Netzer for Child's Pose
 2015 Nae Caranfil for Closer to the Moon
 2016 Radu Jude for Aferim!
 2017 Cristi Puiu for Sieranevada
 2018 Daniel Sandu for One Step Behind the Seraphim
 2019 Constantin Popescu for Pororoca
 2020 Corneliu Porumboiu for The Whistlers
 2021 Alexander Nanau for Collective
 2022 Cristi Puiu for Malmkrog

Best actor
 2007 Ion Sapdaru – 12:08 East of Bucharest
 2008 Räzvan Vasilescu – California Dreamin'
 2009 Dragoș Bucur – Boogie
 2010 Dragoș Bucur – Police, Adjective
 2011 Victor Rebengiuc – Medal of Honor
 2012 Adrian Titieni – Din dragoste cu cele mai bune intenții
 2013 Șerban Pavlu – Everybody in Our Family
 2014 Victor Rebengiuc – The Japanese Dog
 2015 Florin Piersic Jr. – Quod Erat Demonstrandum
 2016 Teodor Corban – Aferim!
 2017 Gheorghe Visu – Dogs
 2018 Vlad Ivanov
 2019 Bogdan Dumitrache – Pororoca
 2020 Iulian Postelnicu – Arrest
 2021 Mihai Călin – 5 Minutes Too Late
 2022  – Unidentified

Best actress
 2007 Dorotheea Petre – Ryna
 2008 Anamaria Marinca – 4 Months, 3 Weeks and 2 Days
 2009 Anamaria Marinca – Boogie
 2010 Hilda Péter – Katalin Varga
 2011 Mirela Oprișor – Tuesday, After Christmas
 2012 Ana Ularu – Outbound
 2013 not awarded
 2014 Luminița Gheorghiu – Child's Pose
 2015 Ofelia Popii – Quod Erat Demonstrandum
 2016 Ioana Flora – Acasă la tata
 2017 Dana Dogaru – Sieranevada
 2018 Diana Cavallioti – Ana, mon amour
 2019 Cosmina Stratan – Love 1. Dog
 2020 Judith State – Monsters
 2021 Diana Cavallioti – 5 Minutes Too Late
 2022  – Bad Luck Banging or Loony Porn

Best screenplay
 2007 Corneliu Porumboiu - 12:08 East of Bucharest
 2008 Cristian Nemescu, Tudor Voican - California Dreamin'
 2009 Nae Caranfil - The Rest Is Silence
 2010 Corneliu Porumboiu - Police, Adjective
 2011 Tudor Voican - Medal of Honor
 2012 Cristi Puiu - Aurora
 2013 Radu Jude, Corina Sabău - Everybody in Our Family
 2014 Răzvan Rădulescu, Călin Peter Netzer - Child's Pose
 2015 Nae Caranfil - Closer to the Moon
 2016 Radu Jude, Florin Lăzărescu - Aferim!
 2017 Cristi Puiu - Sieranevada
 2018 Daniel Sandu - One Step Behind the Seraphim
 2019 Radu Jude - I Do Not Care If We Go Down in History as Barbarians
 2020 Corneliu Porumboiu - The Whistlers
 2021 Dorian Boguță, Loredana Novak – Legacy
 2022 Iulian Postelnicu, Bogdan George Apetri – Unidentified

Lifetime achievement
 2007 Lucian Pintilie
 2008 Jean Constantin
 2009 Elisabeta Bostan, Marin Moraru
 2010 Draga Olteanu Matei
 2011 Ion Besoiu
 2012 Iurie Darie
 2013 Mitică Popescu
 2014 Radu Beligan
 2015 Coca Bloos
 2016 Florin Piersic
 2017 Valentin Uritescu
 2018 George Mihăiță, Vladimir Găitan
 2019 Ileana Stana-Ionescu
 2020 
 2021 Costel Constantin
 2022 Victor Rebengiuc, 

Best European film
 2007 Volver (Pedro Almodóvar) (Spain)
 2008 13 Tzameti (Géla Babluani (Georgia)
 2009 I Served the King of England (Jiří Menzel) (Czech Republic)
 2010 Gomorrah (Matteo Garrone) (Italy)
 2011 The White Ribbon (Michael Haneke) (Germany)
 2012 Melancholia (Lars von Trier) (Denmark)
 2013 not awarded
 2014 Amour (Michael Haneke) (France)
 2015 The Great Beauty (Paolo Sorrentino) (Italy)
 2016 Leviathan (Andrey Zvyagintsev) (Russia)
 2017 Son of Saul (Laszlo Nemes) (Hungary)
 2018 On Body and Soul (Ildikó Enyedi) (Hungary)
 2019 The Killing of a Sacred Deer (Yorgos Lanthimos) (UK / Ireland)
 2020 Pain and Glory (Pedro Almodóvar) (Spain)
 2021 Sorry We Missed You (Ken Loach) (UK / France / Belgium)
 2022 Another Round (Thomas Vinterberg) (Denmark)

See also
 List of film awards
 Film festival

References

External links
Official webpage

Awards established in 2007
2007 establishments in Romania
Romanian film awards